The 1982 NCAA Division I Cross Country Championships were the 44th annual NCAA Men's Division I Cross Country Championship and the 2nd annual NCAA Women's Division I Cross Country Championship to determine the team and individual national champions of NCAA Division I men's and women's collegiate cross country running in the United States. In all, four different titles were contested: men's and women's individual and team championships.

Held on November 22, 1982, the combined meet was hosted by Indiana University at the IU Championship Cross Country Course in Bloomington, Indiana. The distance for the men's race was 10 kilometers (6.21 miles) while the distance for the women's race was 5 kilometers (3.11 miles).

The men's team national championship was won by the Wisconsin Badgers, their first overall title. The individual championship was won by English runner Mark Scrutton, from Colorado, with a time of 30:12.60.

The women's team national championship was again won by the Virginia Cavaliers, their second. The individual championship was won by Lesley Welch, also from Virginia, with a time of 16:39.7.

Qualification
All Division I cross country teams were eligible to qualify for the meet through their placement at various regional qualifying meets. In total, 22 teams and 176 runners contested the men's championship while 16 teams and 132 runners contested the women's title.

Men's title
Distance: 10,000 meters (6.21 miles)

Men's Team Result (Top 10)

Men's Individual Result (Top 10)

Women's title
Distance: 5,000 meters (3.11 miles)

Women's Team Result (Top 10)

Women's Individual Result (Top 10)

Notes

1.  The official NCAA championship statistics website (see references) made a typo where Iowa State scored 207 points. This is not correct, as Iowa State tied with Michigan with 202 points. Reference:

See also
NCAA Men's Division II Cross Country Championship 
NCAA Women's Division II Cross Country Championship
NCAA Men's Division III Cross Country Championship
NCAA Women's Division III Cross Country Championship

References

NCAA Cross Country Championships
NCAA Division I Cross Country Championships
NCAA Division I Cross Country Championships
NCAA Division I Cross Country Championships
Bloomington, Indiana
Track and field in Indiana
Indiana University